Matthew Kelton (born 9 April 1974) is an Australian cricketer. He played in two first-class matches for South Australia in 1997/98.

See also
 List of South Australian representative cricketers

References

External links
 

1974 births
Living people
Australian cricketers
South Australia cricketers
Cricketers from Adelaide